SkeedCast is a P2P video streaming browser plug-in by Dreamboat, released in October 2006. Winny developer Isamu Kaneko has also cooperated in development. The software is also provided by Internet Initiative Japan (IIJ).

Uses
 ABC Dōga Club by Asahi Broadcasting Corporation 
 Official website for the anime Kara no Kyōkai.

External links
 (Japanese) What is SkeedCast? Dreamboat website

Press coverage
 Dreamboat releases new version of Data sharing platform. September 13, 2010. Keyman's Net
 Content distribution network "SkeedCast": Winny's Kaneko also joined development. April 18, 2006. Internet Watch
 Kaneko explains fourth-generation P2P that's different from Winny at live technical seminar. March 2, 2009. Mycom Journal
 Kaneko @ SkeedCast is a programmer to the bone. December 12, 2008. Rikunabi
 IIJ uses Winny technology to distribute content. April 18, 2006. Slashdot Japan (Which also links to a now gone article by Nihon Keizai Shimbun)
 Winny technology inside(?) SkeedCast's details emerge August 30, 2006. Slashdot Japan

Peercasting
Freeware
2006 software
Peer-to-peer software